The 2020 2. deild karla is the 55th season of third-tier football in Iceland. Twelve teams contest the league. The season began on 18 June 2020.

Teams

Club information

League table

Results

References

External links

2. deild karla seasons
Iceland
Iceland
3